North Texas Daily, also known as NT Daily, is the student newspaper of the University of North Texas in Denton, Texas, published daily on the web and every Thursday in print.

In 2015, under the leadership of Editor-In-Chief Nicholas Friedman, North Texas Daily became a digital-first publication, introducing a new brand, website and a focus on social media. The paper focuses on six main categories: News, Arts & Life, Pop culture section The Dose, Sports, sports blog The Sideline and Opinion.

During the summer, the paper publishes daily online and prints On The Record, a monthly magazine.

The multimedia website for the newspaper is ntdaily.com. It includes audio, video and interactive projects, as well as embedded Tweet, Periscope streams and Snapchat posts. Readers also may post comments on stories. The Web site receives approximately 10,000 hits per day.

The newspaper's daily circulation is approximately 10,000. Paper copies are delivered Thursday to campus buildings, dorms and businesses in Denton.

The University of North Texas' student newspaper began publishing in 1916 under the name Campus Chat. In 1971, the newspaper changed its name to the "North Texas Daily." The newspaper celebrated its 90th anniversary in 2006 and will celebrate its 100th anniversary in 2016.

The Daily and the Campus Chat, have earned three regional and six National Pacemaker Awards.  The newspaper has also earned All-American honors from the Associated Collegiate Press and College Media Advisers more than 85 times.  The Daily has also earned awards from the Society of Professional Journalists and the Associated Press Managing Editors as well as on and off-site awards from the Texas Intercollegiate Press Association.

See also
List of college newspapers

External links
 North Texas Daily

Student newspapers published in Texas
University of North Texas
Denton, Texas
Weekly newspapers published in Texas